Clio Barnard (born 1 January 1965)  is a British director of documentary and feature films. She won widespread critical acclaim and multiple awards for her debut, The Arbor, an experimental documentary about Bradford playwright Andrea Dunbar. In 2013 she was hailed  as a significant new voice in British cinema for her film The Selfish Giant, which premiered in the Director's Fortnight section of the Cannes film festival.

Early life and education
Barnard grew up in the town of Otley in Yorkshire. Her father was a university lecturer and her mother was an artist who later became a jazz singer. She graduated from Newcastle Polytechnic (now Northumbria University), with a First Class B.A. (Hons) with distinction in fine art and received a Post-Graduate Diploma in Electronic Imaging at Duncan of Jordanstone College of Art and Design. In 1988, her post grad video work Dirt and Science featured Jane and Louise Wilson and toured internationally as part of the ICA Biennial of Independent Film & Video, curated by Tilda Swinton.

Reception and awards
Critics have likened Barnard's realist yet lyrical work to that of Ken Loach. Time Out said of The Selfish Giant, "this is ‘Kes’ revisited in a post-Thatcher northern England."

Her debut feature, The Arbor (2010) won several awards including Best New Documentary Filmmaker at Tribeca Film Festival New York, Best Newcomer and Sutherland Awards at The London Film Festival, Douglas Hickox Award at British Independent Film Awards, The Guardian First Film Award, Best Screenplay at the London Evening Standard Film Awards, the Sheffield Documentary Film Festival Innovation Award and the Jean Vigo Award for Best Direction at Punto de Vista International Documentary Film Festival. She was nominated for the BAFTA Outstanding Debut Award in February 2011.

Filmography

References

External links
 

British documentary filmmakers
Living people
British film directors
Place of birth missing (living people)
1965 births
British women film directors
Alumni of the University of Dundee
WFTV Award winners
Women documentary filmmakers
Film people from Yorkshire
People educated at Prince Henry's Grammar School, Otley